Never Letting Go is the fourth album by singer–songwriter Phoebe Snow, released in 1977.

Reception

In a retrospective review for AllMusic, critic William Ruhlmann wrote "...the record marked a fall-off in both her commercial success and her artistic accomplishment. The tasty studio musicians and Phil Ramone's pop-jazz production were still in place, and Snow remained a remarkable singer, but her synthesis of styles was beginning to seem not so much inspired as muddled." Robert Christgau wrote of the album; "By now Snow projects a jazz singer's assurance, and the originals are still overshadowed by the covers... the tempos are invariably too reflective, and the reprises invariably too much."

Track listing

All songs written by Phoebe Snow, except where noted.

 "Love Makes a Woman"  (Carl Davis, Eugene Record, William Sanders, Gerald Simms) – 3:21
 "Majesty of Life" – 3:36
 "Ride the Elevator" – 3:55
 "Something So Right" (Paul Simon) – 4:02
 "Never Letting Go" (Stephen Bishop) – 3:12
 "We're Children" – 3:01
 "The Middle of the Night" – 3:33
 "Electra" – 3:53
 "Garden of Joy Blues" (Clifford Hayes) – 4:31

Personnel 
 Phoebe Snow – lead vocals, acoustic guitar (2, 6)
 Ken Ascher – acoustic piano (1, 7, 8), electric piano (1, 5, 7), organ (1), keyboards (3, 9), synthesizers (7), orchestration (7)
 Richard Tee – electric piano (2, 4)
 Bob James – acoustic piano (5), electric piano (6)
 Hugh McCracken – electric guitar (1, 4, 5, 7), acoustic guitar (2, 5, 6), slide guitar (3), harmonica (3) 
 Steve Burgh – electric guitar, 12-string acoustic guitar (5), acoustic guitar (6)
 Steve Khan – electric guitar (1, 3, 7, 8), 12-string electric guitar (8), electric guitar solo (8), acoustic guitar (9)
 Will Lee – bass (1, 5, 6, 7)
 Tony Levin – bass (2, 3, 4, 8, 9)
 Chris Parker – drums (1, 4-7)
 Grady Tate – drums (2, 7)
 Steve Gadd – drums (3, 8, 9)
 Ralph MacDonald – percussion (1, 2, 4, 6)
 Michael Brecker – tenor sax solo (1, 6)
 Hubert Laws – flute solo (2)
 Eddie Daniels – clarinet solo (3)
 Phil Woods – alto sax solo (5)
 William Eaton – orchestration (1, 2, 8), woodwind orchestration (4)
 Robert Freedman – orchestration (3, 5), string orchestration (4)
 David Nadien – concertmaster
 Gwen Guthrie – backing vocals (1, 4, 5)
 Lani Groves – backing vocals (1, 4, 5)
 Patti Austin – backing vocals (1, 4, 5)
 Kenny Loggins – vocals on "We're Children"

Strings
 Janet Hamilton and Charles McCracken – cello
 Russ Savakos – double bass 
 Lamar Alsop and Emanuel Vardi – viola
 Sanford Allen, Joyce Flissler, Harry Glickman, Marvin Morgenstern, Tony Posk, Herbert Sorkin and Carol Webb – violin 

Brass
 Dave Taylor – bass trombone 
 Barry Rogers – trombone 
 Randy Brecker, Victor Paz and Alan Rubin – trumpet and flugelhorn 
 Jonathan Dorn – tube

Woodwinds
 Ron Cuber – baritone saxophone 
 Ray Beckinstein, Leon Cohen, Dave Tofani and George Young – alto flute and clarinet 
 Phil Bodner, Harvey Estrin, Walter Kane and George Marge – bass flute
 Eddie Daniels – B-Flat clarinet
 Michael Brecker and Eddie Daniels – tenor saxophone

Production 
 Phil Ramone – producer, remixing 
 Jim Boyer – engineer 
 Gene Grief – design
 Paula Scher – design

Reception

Phoebe Snow albums
1977 albums
Albums produced by Phil Ramone
Columbia Records albums